Carex tweedieana is a tussock-forming species of perennial sedge in the family Cyperaceae. It is native to parts of South America from southern Brazil in the north to northern Argentina in the south.

See also
List of Carex species

References

tweedieana
Plants described in 1840
Taxa named by Christian Gottfried Daniel Nees von Esenbeck
Flora of Brazil
Flora of Argentina
Flora of Paraguay
Flora of Uruguay